Alexandros Skorilas (born 16 March 2000) is a Greek tennis player.

Skorilas has a career high ATP singles ranking of 1051, achieved on 16 September 2019. He also has a career high doubles ranking of 1057, achieved on 16 March 2020. 

Skorilas represents Greece at the Davis Cup, where he has a W/L record of 3–0.

References

External links

2000 births
Living people
Greek male tennis players
Sportspeople from Ioannina
Sportspeople from Athens